Milanovo may refer to:

 Milanovo, Sofia Province, a village in Bulgaria
 Milanovo (Leskovac), a village in Serbia
 Milanovo (Vranje), a village in Serbia